Princess Street may refer to:

Princess Street (Mumbai), a street in Bombay, India
Princess Street (Kingston, Ontario), the main street of Kingston, Ontario, Canada
Princess Street, Manchester, a street in Manchester, United Kingdom

See also
Princes Street, Dunedin, New Zealand
Princes Street, Edinburgh, Scotland
Gofukucho-dori , Nagoya , Japan